Mahela Gartner-Ockernahl (born 12 June 1969) is a German former professional tennis player. She originally competed under her maiden name Mahela Gartner.

Gartner reached a career high singles ranking of 244 and her best WTA Tour performance was a second round appearance at the 1986 Argentinian Open in Buenos Aires.

References

External links
 
 

1969 births
Living people
West German female tennis players